Bogdan Ionuț Lobonț (born 18 January 1978) is a Romanian professional football coach and former player who played as a goalkeeper.

He amassed 86 appearances for the Romania national team between 1998 and 2018, representing the country in two European Championships. He was popularly nicknamed Motanul ("The Tomcat") in Romania, due to his quick reflexes and relative small body frame for a goalkeeper.

Club career

Early career
Lobonț began his career with hometown club Corvinul Hunedoara in the Romanian Liga II. He remained with the team until 1997, when he moved to Liga I club Rapid București. Lobonț enjoyed success there, winning the 1998–99 league title.

Ajax
In the summer of 2000, Lobonț was transferred by Dutch club AFC Ajax, for a fee of €3 million. Injury and inexperience, however, kept him out of the starting team, and he was loaned to Dinamo București for the 2001–02 season.

Upon his return to Ajax, he became the team's primary goalkeeper. Although Lobonț struggled with occasional injuries, he played well when healthy in both the Eredivisie and the UEFA Champions League.

Fiorentina
In January 2006, Lobonț was sold from Ajax to Italian Serie A club ACF Fiorentina, which needed a goalkeeper after the injury of starting goalkeeper Sébastien Frey. Although he played particularly well, Frey's return meant that he would spend most of the time as a substitute.

Because he had also lost his place on the Romania national team, Lobonț made a surprise move back to Dinamo București in January 2007 and helped the club win the Liga I.

Roma
On 31 August 2009, Italian Serie A team A.S. Roma signed Lobonț in a co-ownership deal from Dinamo, with an option for the club to buy him outright at the end of the season, for a fee of €1.5 million. He made his first appearance for the Giallorossi on 4 October, coming off the bench after 23 minutes in a game against Napoli. On 4 March 2012, he came on against Lazio because of Stekelenburg's red card. Because of starter Maarten Stekelenburg's injury, he was the temporary first goalkeeper in seven matches in the 2011–12 season.

On 1 July 2013, Lobonț signed a new three-year contract with Roma which would keep him at the club until 2016.
Even though he had not featured in an Roma match for about four years, in 2016 he extended his contract with the team yet again, making Roma the last team of his playing career.

International career

Lobonț was part of Romania national team's UEFA Euro 2000 and Euro 2008 squads. He turned in a particularly strong performance in Romania's group stage game in Euro 2008 against world champions Italy, saving numerous well-placed shots and keeping his team's tournament hopes alive with a draw of 1–1.

Lobonț played an important part for the national team, earning over 80 caps, starting from 1998. In May 2014, after fifteen years of service, he announced his retirement from the Romania national team, citing his age as an important factor. In September 2017, after coach Christoph Daum's sacking, he was called to be part of the national squad in the final two matches of the World Cup 2018 qualification stage.

He retired from professional football on 5 June 2018, earning his final cap for Romania in a 2–0 friendly win against Finland at the Ilie Oană Stadium in Ploiești.

Managerial statistics

Honours
Rapid București
Liga I: 1998–99
Cupa României: 1997–98
Supercupa României: 1999

Ajax
Eredivisie: 2003–04

Dinamo București
Liga I: 2001–02, 2006–07

References

External links
 
 
 
 
 
 

1978 births
Living people
Sportspeople from Hunedoara
Romanian footballers
Association football goalkeepers
CS Corvinul Hunedoara players
FC Rapid București players
AFC Ajax players
FC Dinamo București players
ACF Fiorentina players
A.S. Roma players
Liga I players
Eredivisie players
Serie A players
Romania under-21 international footballers
Romania international footballers
UEFA Euro 2000 players
UEFA Euro 2008 players
Romanian expatriate footballers
Romanian expatriate sportspeople in the Netherlands
Expatriate footballers in the Netherlands
Romanian expatriate sportspeople in Italy
Expatriate footballers in Italy
Romanian football managers
FC Universitatea Cluj managers